Burunköy is a village in the District of Söke, Aydın Province, Turkey. In 2010 it had a population of 903.

References

Villages in Söke District